Assembly elections are scheduled to be held in Gilgit Baltistan, Pakistan, less than 60 days after the dissolution of the Gilgit-Baltistan Assembly, which is set to dissolve in November 2025, unless dissolved earlier: in which case the election shall be held within 90 days after dissolution. This means that the election must be held by or before November 2025.

Background

2020 elections 
Following the elections in 2020, the Pakistan Tehreek-e-Insaf (PTI) emerged as the largest party after winning 16 of the 24 general seats in the Gilgit-Baltistan Assembly, and securing a two-thirds supermajority in the assembly after six women representatives (four who went to the PTI) and the three technocrats (two who went to the PTI) were added with a final total of 22 out of 33 seats. Khalid Khurshid was elected as the Chief Minister of Gilgit-Baltistan. The PTI became the first party in the history of the province to secure a two-thirds majority.

Notes

References

Elections in Gilgit-Baltistan
Gilgit-Baltistan